Intervale is a historic home located at Swoope, Augusta County, Virginia. The house was built about 1819, and remodeled and enlarged in the 1880s.  It is a two-story, five bay brick I-house plan dwelling in the Colonial Revival style. It has an original one-story brick ell. The interior woodwork reflects German folk art design.  Also on the property are the contributing log bank barn and a two-level spring house.

It was listed on the National Register of Historic Places in 1985.

References

Houses on the National Register of Historic Places in Virginia
Colonial Revival architecture in Virginia
Houses completed in 1819
Houses in Augusta County, Virginia
National Register of Historic Places in Augusta County, Virginia
I-houses in Virginia